The Emden Deep, also known as the Galathea Deep or Galathea Depth,  is the portion of the  Philippine Trench exceeding  depths in the south-western Pacific Ocean.

Originally discovered by the German ship Emden in 1927, it was first explored in detail by the Danish ship Galathea in 1951 on the Galathea 2 expedition, from which the name is taken. Biological samples collected during the Danish expedition demonstrated for the first time that a wide variety of fish, amphipods, echinoderms and bacteria not only survived, but thrived at the deepest parts of the ocean. At the time of the expedition, the Philippine Trench was the deepest known part of the ocean.

The first crewed descent to the Emden Deep was made by American undersea explorer Victor Vescovo and Filipino oceanographer Deo Florence Onda in March 23, 2021. Findings of the expedition include extensive garbage near the seafloor of the underwater feature.

See also

 Challenger Deep

References

Lowest points of the World Ocean
Oceanic trenches of the Pacific Ocean
Philippine Sea
Philippine tectonics
Subduction zones